Poteria translucida is a species of tropical land snail with gills and an operculum, a terrestrial gastropod mollusk in the family Neocyclotidae.

Distribution 
This species occurs in Venezuela

References

Neocyclotidae